Sutton Group or simply known as Sutton, is a Canadian real estate franchiser and owner-operator with more than 200 locations and over 7,500 Realtors in Canada.

History

Sutton was founded in 1983 in North Vancouver. The CEO of Sutton Group was Drew Keddy until 2019.

References

External links
 Sutton Group, corporate web-site

Real estate companies of Canada
Real estate services companies
Companies based in Burnaby
Canadian brands